Bryan Fryzel (born January 17, 1983), better known by his stage name Frequency, is an American music producer and musician from Rockville Centre, New York.

Biography
Frequency was born in Rockville Centre, New York in 1983. While attending Oceanside High School, he began to DJ at school dances and house parties. He also began experimenting with production. While still in high school, Frequency met 6th Sense, a MC from Pelham, New York. Soon thereafter, the two of them formed a group, The Understudies, alongside 6th Sense's friend and mentor Mr. Tibbs.  The Understudies then signed a record deal on Freshchest/High Time Records, where they released the 12" single, "Now & Then" b/w "Bananas" in the summer of 2004.  Later that year, Frequency went on to work with several artists he had met in New York's independent scene: from Wordsworth ("Shoulder," "One Day" and "Don't Go" on Mirror Music) to Oktober (“NYC” on Projekt: Building) to Tonedef (“Give A Damn Remix” on Archetype) to El Da Sensei (“Natural Feel Good” on The Unusual).

2006 was a break out year for Frequency.  That year, Frequency won Scion's New York leg of the King of the Beats competition, and produced a number of records for major label artists such as “Plenty of Love” by Raekwon, Gravy and Tikky Diamonds and “Ya’ll Can’t Live His Life” by Cam'ron and "Think About It" by Snoop Dogg.  Snoop himself repeatedly referred to the song in interviews as his favorite track on the album.

Soon thereafter, Frequency began working with the Trackmasters, with whom he produced several tracks for an unreleased Lil' Kim LP, as well as tracks for The Game, Keyshia Cole, Beenie Man, Slim (from 112) and others.  He also continued to place records on his own, producing songs such as “One Chance (Make It Good)” for Snoop Dogg's 2008 release Ego Trippin', "Like Me" for Ja Rule, and "White Linen Affair" for Ghostface Killah.

By 2009, Frequency began working extensively with Slaughterhouse, serving as their tour DJ, producing their first two singles -- "Onslaught" and "Fight Klub"—and working with each individual member.  In December of that year, Frequency released "Road Kill" with Joell Ortiz, a mixtape featuring freestyles that Joell recorded during the K.O.D. Tour and four original tracks, three of which - "Ortiz In This Bitch", "Snake Charmer", and "50 For the People" — were produced by Frequency.

Over the next several years, Frequency went on to work with Machine Gun Kelly, B.o.B., Iffy the Badman and more.

Frequency is perhaps best known for co-writing and co-producing the #1 hit song "The Monster" by Eminem featuring Rihanna, released in October 2013.  "The Monster" reached No. 1 on eight separate Billboard charts, including four weeks at No. 1 on the Hot 100 and thirteen weeks at No. 1 on the Hot R&B/Hip-Hop Songs chart.  It also topped the charts in twelve countries including Australia, Canada, France, Ireland, New Zealand, Switzerland, and the United Kingdom and won a Grammy for Best/Rap Sung Collaboration.

In recent years, Frequency has expanded his horizons by working on more pop and rock projects.  Specifically, Frequency produced the debut album for New York-based band MisterWives, entitled Our Own House.  The album's lead single "Reflections" peaked at No. 13 on the Billboard Hot Rock Songs chart and went Gold.  Frequency also produced the debut album "Waiting For The Sun" from Weekday/Sony band Jule Vera and 5 of 7 songs on the debut EP from Bryce Fox.

Selected discography

References

Living people
American hip hop record producers
Production discographies
1983 births